Great Work Mine was a Cornish mine between Godolphin hill and Tregonning Hill and is in the hamlet of Great Work on Bal Lane. Great Work is notable for its unusual chimney stack with the upper brick-work in two stages. The remaining ruin of the mine sits 400 ft above sea level, and is part of the Cornwall and West Devon Mining Landscape.

The site is owned by the National Trust and forms part of the Godolphin Estate along with Godolphin House.

History 
It had opened by 1538. John Leland visited the mine and was quoted as saying "There are no greater Tynne workes yn al Cornwal than be on Sir Wylliam Godolcan's Ground". By 1584 at least 300 employed were there, and the annual profit was £1000. Until 1816 the mine exploited the surface and shallow pits. Deep mining started then and continued until 1873. The mine worked five lodes, ran five engines and employed 500 people.

The mine was put up for sale as a going concern in January 1885. While the mine was not exhausted, new machinery and investment was needed and if the mine was not sold, it would close. Machinery, included three engines, plant and materials were put up for auction on 30 November 1885.

1930 onwards 
 In 1930 the mine closed. Some miners continued working above adit level. The mine was de-watered in the mid-1930s in an attempt to reopen it. The effort was abandoned and the mine closed permanently in 1939. During this time, on Bal Lane a terrace of twenty-six houses were built for miners. The ruins at Great Work reveal a fraction of the mine's extent. In the photo the engine house on the far left is the Leeds shaft and is all that remains.

In 2005 the Leeds shaft engine house was restored. This shaft and Burnt Whim were capped with a metal grate, for safety and to promote nesting bats within the shaft.

See also 

 Wheal Vor

References

Further reading 
 Thomas Lean, On the Steam Engines in Cornwall, 1839. Engine information, weights and measurements. "Table IV, Great Work, Leeds"

Copper mines in Cornwall
Industrial archaeological sites in Cornwall
National Trust properties in Cornwall
Tin mines in Cornwall